Pane, burro e marmellata (translation: "Bread, Butter and Marmalade") is a 1977 Italian comedy film directed by Giorgio Capitani and starring Enrico Montesano.

Cast
 Enrico Montesano as Bruno Desantis
 Rossana Podestà as Simona
 Claudine Auger as Betty
 Rita Tushingham as Vera
 Bente Szacinski
 Laura Trotter
 Franco Giacobini
 Jacques Herlin
 Adolfo Celi
 Stefano Amato
 Paola Arduini
 Dino Emanuelli
 Franca Scagnetti

External links

1977 films
Italian comedy films
1970s Italian-language films
1977 comedy films
Films directed by Giorgio Capitani
Films scored by Piero Umiliani
1970s Italian films